Tamil Selwan Muniswamy (born 3 February 1955) is an Indian weightlifter. He competed in the men's bantamweight event at the 1980 Summer Olympics.

References

1955 births
Living people
Indian male weightlifters
Olympic weightlifters of India
Weightlifters at the 1980 Summer Olympics
Place of birth missing (living people)